The Lancaster House Agreement, signed on 21 December 1979, declared a ceasefire, ending the Rhodesian Bush War; and directly led to Rhodesia achieving internationally recognised independence as Zimbabwe. It required the full resumption of direct British rule, nullifying the Unilateral Declaration of Independence of 1965. British governance would be strictly prescribed to the duration of a proposed election period followed by a formal power transfer back to a recognised, sovereign state. Constitutional instruments would thus be transferred from the British state to a popularly elected government, under an unqualified universal franchise vote. Crucially, the political wings of the black nationalist groups ZANU and ZAPU, who had been waging an increasingly violent insurgency, would be permitted to stand candidates in the forthcoming elections. This was however conditional to compliance with the ceasefire and the verified absence of voter intimidation.

The Agreement would lead to the dissolution of the unrecognised state of Zimbabwe Rhodesia, created months earlier by the Internal Settlement; an agreement forged between moderate black nationalists and Prime Minister Ian Smith's Government. While Zimbabwe Rhodesia remained unrecognised, the Internal Settlement enfranchised the majority of blacks (hitherto the key British demand) and resulted in the election of the country's first black Prime Minister, Bishop Abel Muzorewa.

Lancaster House covered the Independence Constitution, pre-independence arrangements and the terms of ceasefire. The Agreement is named after Lancaster House in London, where the conference on independence from 10 September to 15 December 1979 was held.

The parties represented during the conference were: the British Government, the Patriotic Front led by Robert Mugabe and Joshua Nkomo, ZAPU (Zimbabwe African Peoples Union) and ZANU (Zimbabwe African National Union) and the Zimbabwe Rhodesia Government, represented by Prime Minister, Bishop Abel Muzorewa and Ian Smith, Minister without Portfolio.

Negotiations

Following the Meeting of Commonwealth Heads of Government held in Lusaka from 1–7 August 1979, the British government invited Muzorewa and the leaders of the Patriotic Front to participate in a Constitutional Conference at Lancaster House. The purpose of the Conference was to discuss and reach agreement on the terms of an Independence Constitution, to agree on the holding of elections under British authority, and to enable Zimbabwe Rhodesia to proceed to lawful and internationally recognised independence, with the parties settling their differences by political means.

Lord Carrington, Foreign and Commonwealth Secretary of the United Kingdom, chaired the Conference. The conference took place from 10 September – 15 December 1979 with 47 plenary sessions.

In the course of its proceedings the conference reached agreement on the following issues:
 An outline of the Independence Constitution;
 arrangements for the pre-independence period;
 a cease-fire agreement signed by all the parties.

In concluding this agreement and signing its report, the parties undertook:
 to accept the authority of the Governor;
 to abide by the Independence Constitution;
 to comply with the pre-independence arrangements;
 to abide by the cease-fire agreement;
 to campaign peacefully and without intimidation;
 to renounce the use of force for political ends;
 to accept the outcome of the elections and to instruct any forces under their authority to do the same.

Under the Independence Constitution agreed, 20 per cent of the seats in the country's parliament were to be reserved for whites.  This provision remained in the constitution until 1987.

The agreement as signed on 21 December 1979. Lord Carrington and Sir Ian Gilmour signed the Agreement on behalf of the United Kingdom, Bishop Abel Muzorewa and Dr Silas Mundawarara signed for the Government of Zimbabwe Rhodesia, and Robert Mugabe and Joshua Nkomo for the Patriotic Front.

According to Robert Matthews, the success of the Lancaster House negotiations can be explained by four factors: 
A balance of forces on the battlefield that clearly favoured the nationalists; international sanctions and their adverse effects on Rhodesia's economy and Salisbury's ability to wage war; a particular pattern of third party interests; and finally, the skill and resources that Lord Carrington as mediator brought to the table.

Outcome

Under the terms of the Agreement, Zimbabwe Rhodesia temporarily reverted to its former status as the Colony of Southern Rhodesia, thereby ending the rebellion caused by Rhodesia's Unilateral Declaration of Independence. Lord Soames was appointed Governor with full executive and legislative powers.

In terms of the ceasefire, ZAPU and ZANU guerillas were to gather at designated Assembly Points under British supervision, following which elections were to be held to elect a new government. These elections were held in February 1980, and resulted in the Zimbabwe African National Union - Patriotic Front (ZANU-PF) led by Robert Mugabe winning a majority of seats. Independence in terms of the Constitution agreed to at Lancaster House was granted to Zimbabwe on 18 April 1980 with Robert Mugabe as the first Prime Minister.

British delegation

 Peter Carington, 6th Baron Carrington (Chairman)
 Sir Ian Gilmour
 Sir Michael Havers
 David Ormsby-Gore, 5th Baron Harlech
 Richard Luce
 Sir Michael Palliser
 Sir Antony Duff
 Derek Day
 R. A. C. Byatt
 Robin Renwick, Baron Renwick of Clifton
 P. R. N. Fifoot
 Sir Nicholas Fenn, Head of News Department of the Foreign Office
 George Walden
 Charles Powell
 P. J. Barlow
 R. D. Wilkinson
 A. M. Layden
 R. M. J. Lyne
 M. J. Richardson
 C. R. L. de Chassiron
 A. J. Phillips
 M. C. Wood

Patriotic Front delegation

 Robert Mugabe – ZANU-PF leader and future President of Zimbabwe
 Joshua Nkomo – PF-ZAPU leader
 Josiah Mushore Chinamano – ZAPU leader, moderate, detained with Nkomo, future government minister
 Edgar Tekere – future Government minister, expelled from the party in 1988 after he denounced plans to establish a one-party state in Zimbabwe. He also emerged as a vocal critic of the massacre of civilians in Matabeleland after government launched a crackdown against so-called dissidents in the region. He formed his own party, Zimbabwe Unity Movement (ZUM) in 1989 ahead of general elections in 1990.
 General Josiah Tongogara, ZANLA general, from ZANU militant external wing
 Ernest R Kadungure, ZAPU, future Finance secretary
 Dr H Ushewokunze – first health minister, director of energy and transportation, director of political affairs. Flamboyant and often controversial, he often clashed with the Mugabe administration and was thrown out of the government, welcomed back in, then thrown out again. He died in 1995 and was buried in Zimbabwe's national cemetery. He was declared a national hero.
 Dzingai Mutumbuka – future minister of education
 Josiah Tungamirai – future Air force chief, after retirement as MP for Gutu North.
 Edson Zvobgo – lawyer, Harvard graduate, future Government minister, clashed with Mugabe around press freedom, buried a national hero.
 Dr Simbi Mubako
 Prof Walter Kamba, later Vice-Chancellor of the University of Zimbabwe
 Joseph Msika – ZAPU leader, detained with Nkomo, future vice-president
 T George Silundika – ZAPU Publicity and Information Secretary
 A M Chambati – Future Minister of Finance (and died from cancer within 6 months of accepting the post) after David J M Vincent declined the post.
 John Nkomo – Future vice-president
 L Baron
 S K Sibanda
 E Mlambo
 C Ndlovu
 E Siziba
 K Ndoro

Zimbabwe-Rhodesia delegation

 Prime Minister Bishop Abel Muzorewa
 S C Mundawarara
 E L Bulle
 F. Zindoga
 D C Mukome
 G B Nyandoro
 Reverend Ndabaningi Sithole
 L Nyemba
 Chief Kayisa Ndiweni
 S Musoni
 Z M Bafanah
 I D Smith
 D C Smith
 R Cronje
 C Andersen
 Dr J Kamusikiri
 G Pincus
 L G Smith
 Air Vice Marshal Harold Hawkins
 Dr E M F Chitate
 David Zamchiya
 Simpson Mutambanengwe
 M A Adam
 P Claypole
 Tichaona Noah Bangure
 Gordon Chavunduka

Later developments

In 1981, the British assisted in setting up a Zimbabwe conference on reconstruction and development, at which more than £630 million of international aid was pledged.

In 1997, war veterans began receiving individual personal payments of ZW$50,000 each for their service in the Rhodesian Bush War, costing the nation's tax payers billions of dollars, and depleting government coffers. Some months later, Robert Mugabe announced that the forced acquisition of land under Section 8 would proceed and, within 24 hours, the local currency had devalued more than 50%. Thus began a period of hyperinflation and the demonetisation of the Zimbabwean currency, accompanied by the "Flight of Whites" from the country, most never to return.

According to an independent newspaper in Zimbabwe, the Lancaster House Agreement has been modified or changed more than 27 times since independence.

See also

 Land reform in Zimbabwe

References

Further reading
 Matthews, Robert O. "From Rhodesia to Zimbabwe: prerequisites of a settlement." International Journal 45.2 (1990): 292–333.
 Novak, Andrew. "Face-saving maneuvers and strong third-party mediation: the Lancaster house conference on Zimbabwe-Rhodesia." International Negotiation 14.1 (2009): 149–174. online
 Preston, Matthew. "Stalemate and the termination of civil war: Rhodesia reassessed." Journal of Peace Research 41#1 (2004): 65–83.
 Soames, Lord. "From Rhodesia to Zimbabwe." International Affairs  56#3 (1980): 405–419. online
 Tendi, Blessing-Miles. "Soldiers contra diplomats: Britain’s role in the Zimbabwe/Rhodesia ceasefire (1979–1980) reconsidered." Small Wars & Insurgencies 26.6 (2015): 937–956.
 Waddy, Nicholas. "The Strange Death of 'Zimbabwe-Rhodesia': The Question of British Recognition of the Muzorewa Regime in Rhodesian Public Opinion, 1979." South African Historical Journal 66.2 (2014): 227–248.
 Yorke, Edmund. "'A Family Affair': the Lancaster House Agreement." in Diplomacy at the Highest Level (Palgrave Macmillan, 1996) pp. 200–219.

External links
 Read the full Agreement on UN Peacemaker Database

Rhodesia–United Kingdom relations
Politics of Rhodesia
Treaties concluded in 1979
Treaties of the United Kingdom
Treaties of Zimbabwe
Treaties of Rhodesia
Rhodesian Bush War
United Kingdom and the Commonwealth of Nations
Zimbabwe and the Commonwealth of Nations
1970s in the City of Westminster
1979 in the British Empire